Ialibu Urban LLG is a local-level government (LLG) of Southern Highlands Province, Papua New Guinea.

Wards
05. Yameyame
06. Topopugl 1
07. Topopugl 2
08. Kendal 2
09. Kokogla 1
10. Kendal 3
11. Kendal 4
82. Ialibu Station

References

Local-level governments of Southern Highlands Province